"I Can't See Me Without You" is a song written and recorded by American country music artist Conway Twitty.  It was released in November 1971 as the first single and title track from his album I Can't See Me Without You.  The song peaked at number 4 on the Billboard Hot Country Singles chart. It also reached number 1 on the RPM Country Tracks chart in Canada.

Chart performance

References

1971 singles
1971 songs
Conway Twitty songs
Songs written by Conway Twitty
Song recordings produced by Owen Bradley
Decca Records singles